The 2022 Trofeo Faip–Perrel was a professional tennis tournament played on hard courts. It was the seventeenth edition of the tournament which was part of the 2022 ATP Challenger Tour. It took place in Bergamo, Italy between 31 October and 6 November 2022.

Singles main-draw entrants

Seeds

 1 Rankings were as of 24 October 2022.

Other entrants
The following players received wildcards into the singles main draw:
  Luca Nardi
  Tim van Rijthoven
  Giulio Zeppieri

The following player received entry into the singles main draw as a special exempt:
  Borna Gojo

The following player received entry into the singles main draw as an alternate:
  Dimitar Kuzmanov

The following players received entry from the qualifying draw:
  Altuğ Çelikbilek
  Cem İlkel
  Alibek Kachmazov
  Evgeny Karlovskiy
  Andrea Vavassori
  Otto Virtanen

Champions

Singles

 Otto Virtanen def.  Jan-Lennard Struff 6–2, 7–5.

Doubles

 Henri Squire /  Jan-Lennard Struff def.  Jonathan Eysseric /  Albano Olivetti 6–4, 6–7(5–7), [10–7].

References

2022 ATP Challenger Tour
2022
2022 in Italian tennis
October 2022 sports events in Italy
November 2022 sports events in Italy